The 2013–14 Taça de Portugal was the 74th season of the Taça de Portugal, the premier Portuguese football knockout cup competition organised by the Portuguese Football Federation (FPF). It was contested by 156 teams from the top four tiers of Portuguese football. The competition began with the first-round matches in September 2013 and concluded with the final at the Estádio Nacional in Oeiras, on 18 May 2014.

The title holders were Primeira Liga side Vitória de Guimarães who entered the 2013–14 competition in the third round, together with the Primeira Liga teams, advancing as far as the next round, where they lost 2–0 to Porto.
 
In the final, Benfica defeated Rio Ave 1–0, courtesy of a first-half goal by Nicolás Gaitán, and won the competition for a record 25th time. In doing so, they also established a new Portuguese record of doubles (10) and became the first club to win the domestic treble of Primeira Liga, Taça de Portugal and Taça da Liga.

As the winners of the Taça de Portugal, Benfica earned the right to play in the 2014–15 UEFA Europa League group stage. However, since they had already qualified for the 2014–15 UEFA Champions League as the 2013–14 Primeira Liga winners, Rio Ave took their place as the cup runners-up. As they did not win the Taça de Portugal, Rio Ave had to enter the competition in the third qualifying round.
In addition, Benfica qualified for the 2014 Supertaça Cândido de Oliveira, where they faced again Rio Ave, as a result of having won both league and cup titles.

Format 
As in the previous season, the competition format was organized in a knockout system consisting of seven rounds preceding the final match. The 79 teams competing in the newly formed Campeonato Nacional de Seniores (third tier), the 26 best relegated teams from the 2012–13 Third Division (extinct fourth tier) and the 18 champions of the District cups will enter the first round, with 35 of those teams receiving a bye. In the second round, Segunda Liga teams will join the first-round winners and the remaining teams that received a bye in the previous round. The second-round winners will advance to the third round, where they will meet the top tier Primeira Liga teams for the first time.  
Unlike the previous rounds, which are contested as one-legged fixtures, the semi-finals were played over two legs in a home-and-away basis. The final will be played at a neutral venue, the Estádio Nacional in Oeiras.

Teams 
A total of 156 teams competing in the top four tiers of the Portuguese football were considered eligible by FPF to participate in the competition:

Schedule 
All draws were held at the FPF headquarters in Lisbon.

First round 
A total of 123 teams from the Campeonato Nacional (CN) and District Leagues (D) entered this round. The draw was held on 29 July 2013 and determined the 88 teams contesting this round and the remaining 35 teams receiving a bye. Matches were played on 1 September 2013.

Teams receiving a first-round bye

 Alba (D)
 Atlético Riachense (CN)
 Bustelo (CN)
 Caldas (CN)
 Carapinheirense (CN)
 Cerveira (D)
 Cinfães (CN)
 Cova da Piedade (CN)
 Desportivo de Ronfe (D)
 Eirense (D)
 Esperança de Lagos (CN)
 Fafe (CN)
 Famalicão (CN)
 Felgueiras 1932 (CN)
 Gondomar (CN)
 Igreja Nova (D)
 Juventude de Évora (D)
 Limianos (CN)
 Louletano (CN)
 Loures (CN)
  (CN)
 Lusitano VRSA (D)
 Marinhense (D)
 Mirandela (CN)
 O Grandolense (D)
 Os Oriolenses (D)
 Pedras Rubras (D)
 Pedras Salgadas (CN)
 Piense (D)
 Praiense (CN)
 Sourense (CN)
 Sporting Ideal (CN)
 União de Montemor (CN)
 Vilaverdense (CN)
 Vitória de Sernache (D)

Fixtures

 Oliveira do Bairro (D) 0 – 2 Fabril Barreiro (D)
 Santiago (D) 0 – 1 Estarreja (CN)
 Fátima (CN) 2 – 0 Castro Daire (D)
 Santa Eulália (D) 2 – 1  Portomosense (CN)
 Sousense (CN) 2 – 1 Moura (CN)
 Sintrense (CN) 1 – 2 Mafra (CN)
 Pêro Pinheiro (D) 1 – 1 (4–5p) Torres Novas (D)
 Vila Pouca de Aguiar (D) 0 – 1 Santa Maria (CN)
 Atalaia do Campo (D) 0 – 7 Alcanenense (CN)
 Operário (CN) 1 – 1 (4–3p) Salgueiros 08 (CN)
 Valenciano (CN) 3 – 4 Cesarense (CN)
 Vieira (D) 0 – 3 AD Nogueirense (CN)
 O Elvas (CN) 1 – 2  Barreirense (CN)
 Vila Flor (CN) 0 – 0 (0–3p) Merelinense (D)
 Vizela (CN) 2 – 0 Pampilhosa (CN)
 Boavista (CN) 1 – 0  1º de Dezembro (CN)
 Joane (CN) 0 – 1 Maria da Fonte (D)
 Lourinhanense (CN) 0 – 1 Lusitânia Lourosa (CN)
 AD Oliveirense (CN) 0 – 0 (3–2p) Vila Meã (D)
 Ribeirão (CN) 6 – 0 Sanjoanense (D)
 Almodôvar (CN) 0 – 1 Ninense (CN)
 Vila Cortez (D) 2 – 4 Castrense (D)

 Bragança (CN) 0 – 1 Avanca (D)
 Benfica Castelo Branco (CN) 0 – 0 (2–0p) Carregado (CN)
 Sacavenense (D) 3 – 0 Sampedrense (D)
 Camacha (CN) 5 – 0 Ansião (D)
 Amarante (CN) 1 – 3 Freamunde (CN)
 Aljustrelense (D) 2 – 2 (3–0p) Casa Pia (CN)
 Águias do Moradal (CN) 0 – 2 Sporting de Espinho (CN)
 São João de Ver (CN) 3 – 2 Ferreiras (CN)
 Atlético de Reguengos (D) 0 – 1 Varzim (CN)
 Pinhalnovense (CN) 1 – 1 (4–1p) Coimbrões (CN)
 Torre de Moncorvo (D) 1 – 2 Perafita (CN)
 Marinhas (D) 3 – 0 Naval (CN)
 União de Leiria (CN) 2 – 1  Torreense (CN)
 Grijó (CN) 2 – 2 (5–4p) Lousada (D)
 Lixa (CN) 1 – 2 Tourizense (CN)
 Gafetense (D) 2 – 1 Vianense (CN)
 Anadia (CN) 0 – 1 Sertanense (CN)
 Oriental (CN) 7 – 0 Nogueirense FC (D)
 Quarteirense (CN) 1 – 2 Amora (D)
 Amiense (D) 0 – 4 Tirsense (CN)
 Futebol Benfica (CN) 1 – 0 Oliveira do Hospital (D)
 Aliados de Lordelo (D) 3 – 2 Manteigas (CN)

Second round 
Seventeen teams from the Segunda Liga (II) joined the 44 first-round winners and the 35 teams given a bye into the second round. The draw was made on 9 September 2013 and matches were played on 21 and 22 September.

Fixtures

 Fafe (CN) 2 – 1 Perafita (CN)
 Chaves (II) 8 – 0 Avanca (D)
 Farense (II) 2 – 2 (7–6p) Lusitânia Lourosa (CN) 
 Marinhense (D) 0 – 6 Caldas (CN)
 Benfica Castelo Branco (CN) 2 – 1 União da Madeira (II)
  (CN) 2 – 1 Futebol Benfica (CN)
 São João de Ver (CN) 5 – 0 Lusitano VRSA (D)
 Cerveira (D) 1 – 3 Cova da Piedade (CN)
 Académico de Viseu (II) 2 – 1 AD Nogueirense (CN)
 Beira-Mar (II) 4 – 1 Grijó (CN)
 Santa Eulália (D) 2 – 0 Ninense (CN)
 Felgueiras 1932 (CN) 2 – 0 Bustelo (CN)
 Maria da Fonte (D) 2 – 3  O Grandolense (D)
 Fátima (CN) 1 – 1 (1–0p) Sporting Ideal (CN)
 Vilaverdense (CN) 1 – 0 Atlético Riachense (CN)
 Varzim (CN) 3 – 0 Sporting de Espinho (CN)
 Esperança de Lagos (CN) 1 – 0 Pedras Rubras (D)
 Oliveirense (II) 2 – 1 Limianos (CN)
 União de Leiria (CN) 3 – 1 Marinhas (D) 
 Sporting da Covilhã (II) 3 – 1 Tourizense (CN)
 Ribeirão (CN) 4 – 0 Juventude de Évora (D)
 Estarreja (CN) 1 – 5 Cinfães (CN)
 Pinhalnovense (CN) 0 – 1 Santa Clara (II)
 Santa Maria (CN) 4 – 1 Cesarense (CN)
 Atlético CP (II) 0 – 0 (1–0p) Mirandela (CN)
 Alba (D) 2 – 1 União de Montemor (CN)
 Loures (CN) 2 – 2 (4–3p) Carapinheirense (CN)
 Tondela (II) 5 – 1 Torres Novas (D)
 Alcanenense (CN) 3 – 1 Barreirense (CN)
 Famalicão (CN) 3 – 0 Eirense (D)
 Leixões (II) 2 – 0 Sacavenense (D)
 Mafra (CN) 3 – 0 Os Oriolenses (D)
 Gafetense (D) 1 – 1 (4–1p) Sourense (CN)
 Fabril Barreiro (D) 0 – 2 Operário (CN)
 Freamunde (CN) 4 – 0 Desportivo de Ronfe (D)
 AD Oliveirense (CN) 1 – 0 Vizela (CN)
 Piense (D) 2 – 2 (4–3p) Vitória de Sernache (D)
 Castrense (D) 2 – 3 Camacha (CN)
 F.C. Penafiel (II) 2 – 1 Tirsense (CN)
 Moreirense (II) 9 – 0 Merelinense (D)
 Boavista (CN) 1 – 2 Portimonense (II)
 Aljustrelense (D) 3 – 1 Igreja Nova (D)
 Trofense (II) 3 – 0 Pedras Salgadas (CN)
 Louletano (CN) 2 – 0 Praiense (CN)
 Sertanense (CN) 4 – 2 Amora (D)
 Feirense (II) 2 – 1 Sousense (CN)  
 Oriental (CN) 1 – 0 Aliados de Lordelo (D) 
 Gondomar (CN) 1 – 2 Desportivo das Aves (II)

Third round 
The 16 teams from the Primeira Liga (I) joined the 48-second-round winners in the third round. The draw was held on 30 September 2013 and matches were played on 19 and 20 October 2013.

Fixtures

Fourth round 
The draw for the fourth round took place on 24 October 2013 and matches were played on 16, 17 and 24 November and 4 December 2013.

Fixtures

Fifth round 
The draw for the fifth round took place on 22 November 2013 and matches were played on 4 and 5 January 2014.

Fixtures

Quarter-finals 
The draw for the quarter-finals took place on 9 January 2014, and matches were played on 5 and 6 February 2014.

Fixtures

Semi-finals 
The semi-final pairings were determined on 9 January 2014, following the draw for the quarter-finals. This round was played over two legs, with the first leg played on 26 March and the second leg played on 16 April 2014.

First leg

Second leg

Final

Notes

References

External links
Official webpage 

2013-14
2013–14 domestic association football cups
2013–14 in Portuguese football